Đông Sơn is a rural district of Thanh Hóa province in the North Central Coast region of Vietnam.  the district had a population of 109,819. The district covers an area of 106 km². The district capital lies at Rừng Thông.

Administrative divisions

The district is divided into fifteen communes and one township:
 Rừng Thông township
 Đông Hoàng
 Đông Ninh
 Đông Khê
 Đông Hòa
 Đông Yê
 Đông Minh
 Đông Thanh
 Đông Tiến
 Đông Anh
 Đông Thịnh
 Đông Văn
 Đông Phú
 Đông Nam
 Đông Quang

References

Districts of Thanh Hóa province